Steve Jones (born 4 December 1957) is a British former cyclist. He competed in the team time trial event at the 1980 Summer Olympics.

References

External links
 

1957 births
Living people
British male cyclists
Olympic cyclists of Great Britain
Cyclists at the 1980 Summer Olympics
Sportspeople from Birmingham, West Midlands
20th-century British people